Johann Adam Freiherr von Ickstatt (6 January 1702 – 17 August 1776) was a German educator and director of the University of Ingolstadt. Born in Vockenhausen, he was a major proponent of the Enlightenment in Bavaria. He died in Waldsassen. He was a godfather to Adam Weishaupt.

Notes

Sources
  Allgemeine Deutsche Biographie (ADB) Vol. 13, pp. 740–741.

1702 births
1776 deaths
Barons of Germany
Age of Enlightenment
Academic staff of the University of Ingolstadt